Peter the Iberian (c. 417-491) was a Georgian royal prince, theologian and philosopher who was a prominent figure in early Christianity and one of the founders of Christian Neoplatonism. Some have claimed that he is the author known conventionally as Pseudo-Dionysius the Areopagite.

His accomplishments include founding the first Georgian monastery in Bethlehem and becoming the bishop of Majuma near Gaza. The oldest Georgian Bir el Qutt inscriptions mention Peter with his father.

Life
He was born into the royal Chosroid dynasty of the Kings of Iberia (Eastern Georgia) and was initially named Murvan (alternatively, Nabarnugios), Prince of Iberia (Kartli). His father, King Bosmarios of Iberia, invited noted philosopher Mithradates from Lazica to take part in Murvan's education. For a time, the child was kept hidden so as not to be delivered as a hostage to the Persians.

In 423, at the age of about five, the prince was sent as a political hostage to Constantinople to ensure the loyalty of Iberia to the Byzantines rather than to the Persians. Here he received a brilliant education under a personal patronage of the Roman empress Aelia Eudocia, wife of Theodosius II.

According to his biographer, John Rufus, Peter refused to write to or receive letters from home lest it undermine his ascetic discipline. When he was about twenty, the young prince, together with his mentor Mithradates, left the palace and escaped to make a pilgrimage to Palestine, where he became a monk at Jerusalem under the name of Peter. In 430, he founded his own monastery at Bethlehem (later known as the Georgian Monastery of Bethlehem). In 445, he was ordained as a priest. Accompanied by Mithradates (now called John), he traveled across several countries of the Near East and finally settled in Majuma near Gaza.

In 452, he was consecrated bishop of Majuma by Patriarch Theodosius. He only served for six months before some Christians were banished by the decree of the local ruler. Peter escaped to Egypt, where he found refuge in the Enaton.

In the early 470s, Peter moved to Palestine where he continued ascetic activities, visiting various towns and villages of Palestine. Here he acquired great fame as a holy Father. He was called "pillar of Orthodoxy", "Great Peter", "the second Apostle Paul", "the second Moses" and "an exceedingly wonderful person". He gained numerous followers and disciples. According to the medieval sources, he was an author of several famous religious works. However, none of them survived to be written under the name of Peter. He died at Yavneh-Yam, port of ancient Iamnia, in 491 and was buried in his monastery near Gaza.

Position vs. Chalcedonian creed
Various eastern Churches think that he may have deviated from the Chalcedonian doctrine. These Churches (Armenian, Coptic, etc) believe that Peter the Iberian was a Miaphysite and an anti-Chalcedonian, whereas this view is not shared by the Georgian Orthodox Church. Although his biographies do not discuss this issue, some of the scholars who side with the Armenian sources accept the idea that he was an anti-Chaldeonian, while others do not. For example, David Marshall Lang believes in the possibility that he was a Monophysite, while Shalva Nutsubidze and Ernest Honingmann believe that he was a Neoplatonic philosopher.

Biographies
Peter's Vita was written by his disciple, John Rufus (John of Beth Rufina), later his successor as bishop of Maiuma.
 The so-called Syriac version of John Rufus' in Greek original, dates back to the 8th century
 The so-called Georgian version originally written by Peter's contemporary, Zacharias Rhetor, bishop of Mytilene, in Greek has been preserved as a manuscript of c. 13th century.

See also
 Severus of Antioch
 Culture of Georgia

Notes

References 
 Horn, Cornelia B. (2006), Asceticism And Christological Controversy in Fifth-century Palestine: The Career of Peter The Iberian. Oxford University Press, .
 The Life of Peter the Iberian from Lives and Legends of the Georgian Saints by David Marshall Lang
 A. Kofsky. Peter the Iberian. Pilgrimage, Monasticism and Ecclesiastical Politics in Byzantine Palestine
 A Repertoire of Byzantine "Beneficial Tales"
 The Byzantine Fathers by Georges Florovsky
 Zachariah of Mitylene, Syriac Chronicle (1899). Book 6

Further reading 
 David Marshall Lang, "Peter the Iberian and His Biographers". Journal of Ecclesiastical History, vol. 2 (1951), pp 156–168
 Jan-Eric Steppa, John Rufus and the World Vision of Anti-Chalcedonian Culture, (Gorgias Press, 2002), xxvii + 199 pp. 
 Ernest Honigmann, Pierre l'iberian et les ecrits du Pseudo-Denys l'Aréopagite, Bruxelles, 1952 (French)
 Petre Iberi. Works, Tbilisi, 1961 (Georgian)
 Shalva Nutsubidze. Mystery of Pseudo-Dionys Areopagit, Tbilisi, 1942 (Georgian, English summary)
 Shalva Nutsubidze. Peter the Iberian and problems of Areopagitics. - Proceedings of the Tbilisi State University, vol. 65, Tbilisi, 1957 (Russian)
 A. Kofsky. "Peter the Iberian and the Question of the Holy Places," Cathedra 91 (1999), pp. 79–96 (Hebrew).
 Besik Khurtsilava. The inscriptions of the Georgian Monastery in B'ir el-Qutt and their chronology,"Christianity in the Middle East", No 1, Moscow, 2017, pp. 129–151
ქართული ლიტერატურის ქრესტომათია. ტ. I შედგ. ს. ყუბანეიშვილის მიერ. ტ. I. თბ. 1944.
ძველი ქართული აგიოგრაფიული ლიტერატურის ძეგლები, ი. აბულაძის რედაქციით, II ტ. თბ. 1967.
ძველი ქართული აგიოგრაფიული ლიტერატურის ძეგლები, IV, ე. გაბიძაშვილის და მ. ქავთარიას რედაქციით, ტ. თბ. 1968 .
ცხოვრება პერტე იბერისა, ასურული რედაქცია გერმანულიდან თარგმნა, გამოკვლევა, კომემტარები და განმარტებითი საძიებლები დაურთო ი. ლოლაშვილმა, თბილისი, 1988.
პეტრე იბერიელი (ფსევდო-დიონისე არეოპაგელი). შრომები. თარგმ. ეფრემ მცირისა. ს. ენუქაშვილის გამოც. თბ. 1961.
შ. ნუცუბიძე. პეტრე იბერი და ანტიკური ფილოსოფიური მემკვიდრეობა. შრომები. ტ. V. თბ. 1975.
ს. ყაუხჩიშვილი. ბერძნული ლიტერატურის ისტორია. ტ. III. თბ. 1973.
Н. Марр. Житие Петра Ивера, царевича—подвижника и епископа Мойюмского V века. Православный палестинский сборник. 1896 г. т. 16.
მ. თარხნიშვილი, ახლად აღმოჩენილი ქართული მონასტერი ბეთლემში, ბედი ქართლისა, 16, 1954.
გ. წერეთელი, უძველესი ქართული წარწერები პალესტინიდან, თბილისი, 1960.

411 births
491 deaths
Philosophers from Georgia (country)
Saints of Georgia (country)
Byzantine theologians
5th-century philosophers
Holy Land during Byzantine rule
Christian monks from Georgia (country)
5th-century Christian saints
5th-century Christian theologians
Byzantine people of Georgian descent
Chosroid dynasty
People from medieval Georgia (country)
Neoplatonists
Founders of Christian monasteries
5th-century Christian monks
5th-century Syrian bishops